A Deli (from Turkish deli, meaning "mad, wild, daring") was a member of a light cavalry unit within the Ottoman Empire. Their main role was to act as front-line shock troops, also acting as personal guards for high-level Ottoman officials in the Rumeli during peacetime.

History
The first Delis were created by the Bosnian and Semendire governors. Gazi Husrev-beg was the leader most associated with these troops, who employed about 10,000 of them. Due to the efficiency of Husrev-beg, other district (ie frontier and inland) governors of Rumelia began to imitate him. The majority are Turks and they were chosen from among the peoples living in Rumelia. 

The unit was first established in Rumelia Eyalet around the middle of the 15th century to create a force to protect the borders of the empire in the Balkans and came to full power around the 16th century.

The unit is usually confused in historical records with the Akinji, both being light cavalry units and being part of Eyalet soldiers, although they were not related.

Sultan Mahmud II abolished the unit in 1829, along with the disbandment of the Janissaries, in attempts to reform the army and establish one in the Western model.

In popular culture
In the Turkish movie, Deliler Fatih'in Fermanı: directed by Osman Kaya, a small group of Delis is sent to Wallachia in order to kill the Romanian Prince Vlad the Impaler.

Gallery

References

Sources
 
 

Military units and formations of the Ottoman Empire
Ottoman Army
Special forces
Ottoman period in the Balkans
Types of military forces